Elizabeth was launched at Bermuda in 1786 or 1790. She first appeared in Lloyd's Register (LR) in 1802. She then made four voyages as a slave ship, during the second of which a French privateer captured her. Next, after the end of British participation in the trans-Atlantic slave trade, she spent a little over a year as a hired armed tender under contract to the British Royal Navy. She returned to mercantile service trading with Madeira or Africa, until another French privateer captured her in early 1810.

Career
Elizabeth entered LR in 1802 with C. Breer, master, Ingram & Co., owner, and trade Liverpool–Africa.

Slave ship
Slave voyage #1 (1802-1803): Captain Christopher Brew sailed from Liverpool on 10 June 1802, for Africa. Elizabeth arrived at Trinidad on 28 February 1803. She had embarked 250 slaves and she landed 225, for a loss rate of 10%. She left Trinidad on 5 April and arrived back at Liverpool on 30 May. She had left Liverpool with 24 crew members and she suffered 2 crew deaths on the voyage.

Slave voyage #2 (1803-1804): War with France had resumed while Elizabeth was on her first slave trading voyage. Before he set out on his second voyage, Brew acquired a letter of marque on 6 January 1804. He sailed from Liverpool for the Bight of Benin on 26 January. Elizabeth gathered her slaves at Lagos/Onim.

Lloyd's List reported on 14 September 1804 that the French privateer Grande Decide had captured Elizabeth. By one report the French took Elizabeth into Guadeloupe. It is unknown how many slaves Elizabeth had embarked and how many she landed at Basse-Terre. She had left Liverpool with 31 crew members and had one crew death on her voyage.  

In July  recaptured Elizabeth, of Liverpool, that "Decidé" had captured while Elizabeth was sailing from the coast of Africa with a cargo of slaves.

Slave voyage #3 (1805-1806): Elizabeth returned to Liverpool and new ownership. On 2 August 1805 Captain James Brown acquired a letter of marque. Elizabeth sailed from Liverpool on 15 September 1805, bound for Africa. She arrived at Dominica on 10 March 1806. It is unknown how many slaves Elizabeth had embarked and how many she landed. She had left Liverpool with 32 crew members and suffered 12 crew deaths on her voyage. She also underwent some small repairs after she returned.

Slave voyage #4 (1806-1807): Captain Brown sailed from Liverpool on 17 July 1806, bound for the Bight of Biafra and the Gulf of Guinea islands. Elizabeth gathered slaves at New Calabar and arrived at Kingston, Jamaica, on 31 January 1807. She arrived with 313 slaves, but it is not clear how many she embarked, and how many she finally landed. She left Jamaica on 13 April and arrived back at Liverpool on 5 June. She had left Liverpool with 34 crew members and she suffered seven crew deaths on her voyage.

On 10 February 1807 the Parliament of the United Kingdom passed An Act for the Abolition of the Slave Trade, which prohibited the slave trade in the British Empire. Only vessels that had cleared outbound prior to 1 May were permitted to set out on a last legal voyage.

Hired armed tender
Elizabeth needed a new trade. She next served under the Royal Navy under contract from 22 January 1808 to 27 April 1809 as a hired armed tender.

Merchantman
Entries in Lloyd's Register and the Register of Shipping are indicative, not definitive. They were only as accurate as owners choose to keep them. Some discrepancies between the two sources are also due to differences in publication dates.

Fate
On 13 February 1810 Lloyd's List reported that the French privateer  had captured Elizabeth, Briant, master, as Elizabeth was sailing from Liverpool to Africa. Lloyd's Register for 1811 carried the annotation "captured" under Elizabeths name.

Notes

Citations

References
 

1786 ships
Ships built in Bermuda
Liverpool slave ships
Captured ships
Hired armed vessels of the Royal Navy
Age of Sail merchant ships of England